Dean John Sauer (born November 13, 1974) is an American lawyer who previously served as Solicitor General of Missouri and Deputy Attorney General for Special Litigation in the U.S. state of Missouri.

Education 

Sauer graduated from Saint Louis Priory School, a  Catholic secondary day school for boys in Creve Coeur, suburban St. Louis, Missouri, run by the Benedictine monks of Saint Louis Abbey. Sauer received his Bachelor of Arts in philosophy and his Bachelor of Science in Engineering in electrical engineering from Duke University. He earned a Master of Arts in philosophy from the University of Notre Dame and was a Rhodes Scholar at Oxford University, where he earned a Bachelor of Arts in theology. Sauer received his Juris Doctor from Harvard Law School, where he was the articles editor for the Harvard Law Review.

Legal career 
After law school, Sauer served as a law clerk to Judge J. Michael Luttig of the United States Court of Appeals for the Fourth Circuit and to Justice Antonin Scalia of the Supreme Court of the United States.

Sauer worked as a litigation associate at Cooper & Kirk and then became an Assistant United States Attorney for the Eastern District of Missouri. He later entered private practice again.

In January 2017, then-Missouri Attorney General Josh Hawley appointed Sauer Solicitor General of Missouri.

On December 10, 2020, as Solicitor General Counsel of Record, Sauer signed the "Motion of States of Missouri, Arkansas, Louisiana, Mississippi, South Carolina, And Utah To Intervene And Proposed Bill of Complaint In Intervention" in an attempt to overturn the 2020 United States presidential election. The motion sought to intervene and join the Texas Bill of Complaint (filed by Texas Attorney General Ken Paxton), which seeks to prevent the selection of presidential electors based upon the November election results in Pennsylvania, Georgia, Wisconsin, and Michigan.

In January 2023, Missouri Attorney General Andrew Bailey appointed Sauer Deputy Attorney General for Special Litigation. Sauer resigned from his post on January 27, 2023.

See also 
 List of law clerks of the Supreme Court of the United States (Seat 9)
 List of Rhodes Scholars

References

External links 
 Appearances at the U.S. Supreme Court from the Oyez Project

|-

1974 births
Living people
21st-century American lawyers
American Rhodes Scholars
Assistant United States Attorneys
Duke University Pratt School of Engineering alumni
Federalist Society members
Harvard Law School alumni
Law clerks of the Supreme Court of the United States
Lawyers from St. Louis
Missouri lawyers
Solicitors General of Missouri
University of Notre Dame alumni
Washington University in St. Louis faculty
Duke University Trinity College of Arts and Sciences alumni
Law clerks of J. Michael Luttig